There are numerous codes of football in New South Wales, Australia:

The code most commonly referred to as football in New South Wales is rugby league, other codes are also known as football on a national and international basis.

For Rugby league football see Rugby league in New South Wales.  The main organising body is the New South Wales Rugby League. 
For Rugby union football see the main organising body, the New South Wales Rugby Union.
For Association football see Association football in New South Wales.  The main organising body is Football NSW.
For Australian rules football see Australian rules football in New South Wales.
For Gaelic Football see the main organising body the New South Wales GAA.